The 2016 AFL season was the 26th season in the Australian Football League contested by the Adelaide Football Club.

Following the conclusion of the 2015 season which was marred by the mid-season passing of previous head coach Phil Walsh due to an alleged murder, former assistant coach Don Pyke was named as the club's new head coach for the 2016 season on 9 October 2015. Scott Camporeale had acted as interim head coach between Walsh's death and Pyke's appointment, but after electing not to apply for the full-time coaching role, reverted to his previous role of midfield coach for the new season.

2016 Squad

Playing list changes

The following summarises all player changes between the conclusion of the 2015 season and the beginning of the 2016 season.

In

Out

Coaching panel changes

The following summarises all coaching changes between the conclusion of the 2015 season and the beginning of the 2016 season.

Season summary

Pre-season matches

Home and away season
Players written in bold received Brownlow Medal votes for their game.

Finals matches

Ladder

Match Review Panel

Awards

Brownlow Medal

Italics denotes ineligible players

Malcolm Blight Medal Top 10

Other Awards 

Leading Goalkicker: Eddie Betts (75)

Phil Walsh Best Team Man: Eddie Betts

Chelsea Phillis Coaches Award: Rory Sloane

Mark Bickley Emerging Talent: Jake Lever

19th Man Award: Rory Sloane

Dr Brian Sando OAM Trophy: David Mackay

State League Club Champion: Jono Beech

Dean Bailey Award: Luke Carey

Crows Children's Foundation Community Leadership Award: Kyle Hartigan and Charlie Cameron

Individual awards and records

Milestones

Debuts

1They had previously played for another club but played their first match for Adelaide.

Reserves

Regular season
Players written in bold received Magarey Medal votes for their game.

References

Adelaide Football Club seasons
Adelaide